Actinorhytis is a monotypic genus of flowering plant in the palm family found in Oceania and southeast Asia. The lone species, Actinorhytis calapparia (commonly known as calappa palm) is a rain forest inhabitant and has very large fruit. The genus name is from two Greek words meaning 'ray' and 'fold' which describe the endosperm of the seed.

Description
At the base, the white to tan trunks are anchored by a large, conical mass of aerial roots and are topped by a distinct  crownshaft, slightly bulging at the base. The leaflets are closely and regularly arranged along the rachis and the abaxially rounded petiole is usually long in youth but shorter in maturity.

The much branched monoecious inflorescence forms below the leaf bases, ringing the trunk with cream-coloured male and female flowers. Both sexes carry three sepals and three petals and in both cases the sepals are two or three times longer than the petals. The inflorescence becomes pendent as the large fruit set; the beaked, ovoid fruit are red to purple to green; each fruit contains one seed.

Distribution and habitat 
While understory subjects for much of their life, they eventually reach the top of the forest canopy. The species is also reportedly naturalised in Thailand, Sumatra, and peninsular Malaysia.

Cultivation and uses 
Actinorhytis calapparia is widely cultivated in Southeast Asia and Malesia where villagers attribute it magical or medicinal powers, or as a substitute to betel. They have little tolerance for drought, requiring generous water as well as nutrient rich soil; they do, however, exhibit some tolerance to cold.

References

External links 
 Fairchild Guide to Palms
 GBIF Portal with distribution map

Archontophoenicinae
Monotypic Arecaceae genera
Trees of New Guinea
Trees of the Solomon Islands
Taxa named by Carl Georg Oscar Drude